The Asia Professional Baseball Championship (APBC) is a World Baseball Softball Confederation-sanctioned international baseball competition jointly launched with the Chinese Professional Baseball League, Korea Baseball Organization and Nippon Professional Baseball leagues. The three-nation tournament is contested by the U-24 national teams of Japan, South Korea and Chinese Taipei.

Finals results

References

External links

 
International baseball competitions in Asia
Recurring sporting events established in 2017